Plastic soul is described as soul music that is believed to lack authenticity.

Usages
Paul McCartney referenced the phrase as the name of the Beatles 1965 album Rubber Soul, which was inspired by the term "plastic soul". In a studio conversation recorded in June 1965 after recording the first take of "I'm Down", McCartney says  "Plastic soul, man. Plastic soul." 

David Bowie also described his own funky, soulful songs released in the early to mid-1970s as "plastic soul". These singles sold well, and Bowie became one of the few white performers to be invited to perform on  Soul Train. In a 1976 Playboy interview, Bowie described his recent album Young Americans as "the definitive plastic soul record. It's the squashed remains of ethnic music as it survives in the age of Muzak, written and sung by a white limey." Bowie's most commercially successful album, Let's Dance, has also been described as plastic soul.

See also
Selling out
Commercialism
Artistic integrity

Notes

1960s neologisms
1960s in music
1970s in music
1980s in music
British styles of music
David Bowie
The Beatles